The Church of the Nativity of Mary was a  church located in the city of Mariupol in Ukraine .

History 
Between 1770 and 1780 a stone building was built in its place, and consecrated in 1780. The painter Arkhip Kuindzhi was baptized in the Church of the Nativity of the Virgin and married there in 1875 with Vera Leontyevna Kechedzhi-Shapovalova, the daughter of a wealthy merchant from Mariupol. In Soviet times the church was destroyed in 1936. The baptismal font of the destroyed church can be found today in the Kuindzhi Art Museum

References

Buildings and structures in Mariupol